Petro Havrylenko (1883–1920) was a Ukrainian anarchist that acted as a commander and chief of staff in the Revolutionary Insurgent Army of Ukraine during the Ukrainian Civil War.

Biography
Born into a peasant family, he joined the ranks of the anarchists during the 1905 Russian Revolution. During the Ukrainian War of Independence, he was an active participant in the Makhnovist movement. In early November 1919 he was elected assistant commander of the second group of infantry units of the 2nd and 3rd Corps, created to oust the troops of the Armed Forces of South Russia (AFSR) from the Huliaipole area. Commanding the 3rd Katerynoslav Corps, he played a significant role in the defeat of the AFSR. In January 1920 he was temporarily acting chief of staff of the Insurgent Army, and was arrested by the Soviet authorities, who imprisoned him in Kharkiv.

After the conclusion of the agreement between the Black and Red armies, Havrylenko was released from the Cheka prisons. He was immediately sent to the Southern Front and appointed as chief of staff of the Insurgent Army under Semen Karetnyk. After their victory over the Russian Army at the siege of Perekop, the Insurgent detachment was ordered to be integrated into the 4th Army and transferred to the Caucasus. On 25 November 1920, Karetnyk and Havrylenko were summoned to a command meeting in Huliaipole, but they were ambushed en route and executed by the Cheka.

References

Bibliography

Further reading 

 
 Verstyuk, V. F. Махновщина. К. (1991)
 Seryogin, S. Третій шлях. Гуляйполе. (1998)

1883 births
1920 deaths
Anarchist partisans
Deaths by firearm in Ukraine
Makhnovshchina
People from Alexandrovsky Uyezd (Yekaterinoslav Governorate)
People from Huliaipole
Prisoners and detainees of the Soviet Union
Ukrainian anarchists
Ukrainian people executed by the Soviet Union
Ukrainian people of the Ukrainian–Soviet War
Executed anarchists